The following is a list of MTV Asia Awards winners for Favorite Male Artist.

MTV Asia Awards